Cyrtoxipha is a genus of green trigs in the family Gryllidae. There are at least 30 described species in Cyrtoxipha.

Species
These 30 species belong to the genus Cyrtoxipha.

References

Further reading

External links

 

Crickets